Salamanca (Otomi: Xidoo "Place of Tepetate") is a city in the Mexican state of Guanajuato.

Founded January 1, 1603 as 'Villa de Salamanca' by the Viceroy Gaspar de Zuniga and Acevedo, fifth Earl of Monterrey, who was originally from Salamanca (Spain). The town was founded in the lands of Bajio, after cattle ranchers and poor farmers, a few Spaniards, and small groups of Otomi Indians who formerly occupied a village named Xidoo, already lived in the area.

In recent years, many refineries have opened, and Salamanca has grown rapidly to become an important site for manufacturing and service industry in the region. Also, the University of Guanajuato has made many scientific contributions to develop agricultural and industrial technologies, giving a boost to the local and regional industries.

The city reported a 2020 census population of 273,417. The fourth-largest city in the state (behind León, Irapuato, and Celaya), it is also the largest of four places called "Salamanca" in Mexico.

Cuisine
Salamanca's cuisine is very diverse because, thanks to the oil refinery, it is a city that has people from all over the country, from cities such as Veracruz, Oaxaca and Mexico City. Each of these cities has its own variety of food, so one can find enchiladas, wheat gorditas, pambazo, hamburgers, its famous carnitas (pulled pork), arrachera, cabrito (goat), birria, barbecue, cecina, and pizza.  There are food stands on virtually every street corner. Many types of locally made ice pops & ice cream are also popular in the city.

Industry
The petrochemical industry is the primary one in the city, giving rise to numerous companies and bus transport services available for employees. The strategy was to boost the creation and development of the so-called "industrial corridor" of the Bajio.

The largest Pemex refinery in Mexico is located in Salamanca, and it is the 11th largest crude oil refinery in the world.

Also noteworthy is CFE Thermoelectric, a source of significant employment in the municipality.

In Feb 2014, Mazda opened its North American plant outside of Salamanca. At full production, the plant is expected to produce up to 240,000 vehicles per year and employ over 4,600 workers. About 30 percent of the vehicles sold in the United States will be sourced from this factory.

Communications

Road links

It is possible to get to Salamanca by Mexican Federal Highway 45, which links the cities of Querétaro, Celaya, Irapuato, Silao and León; as well as Mexico City through Mexican Federal Highway 57. Also Mexican Federal Highway 43 links south to Morelia and Lazaro Cardenas.

Air transportation
While the city itself doesn't have an airport, it can be served by the Bajío International Airport (BJX), which serves the entire state of Guanajuato; the airport itself is about 50 kilometers away.

Rail transportation
Mexico hasn't had any long-distance rail passenger service since 2000 (except for a tourist line in the northwest), however there are plans to build a statewide Interurban Railway linking the same cities currently linked by Highway 45, in addition to the state's capital. However, this project has been stalled for at least 10 years.

TV/Radio stations
There are four available AM radio stations in the city: XEMAS, XEEMM, XEZH, XESAG, as well as one local TV channel available to local cable subscribers.

Culture
The city has a rich craft industry, especially statues of wax, bronze, and pewter, and is also the location of the headquarters of the Center for the Arts of Guanajuato.

The former convent of San Juan de Sahagún and its church (with 12 monumental altarpieces artistically carved with 24 carat gold-plated sheet), and the former parish of St. Bartolomé Apostle are located within the city.

Higher education
Salamanca offers several : 
 Engineering Division, Irapuato-Salamanca Campus (DICIS), University of Guanajuato 
 Technological University of Salamanca (UTS)
 Centro de Estudios Profesionales de Salamanca (CEPSA) 
 University of Salamanca University of La Salle Bajio 
 University of Salamanca University of Leon 
 School of Engineering and Architecture of Bajio ESIABAC

Sports
Salamanca currently had a soccer team named Catedráticos Élite F.C. (known as the Oilers) playing in Liga Premier.

Notable residents
Guillermina Jiménez Chabolla "Flor Silvestre" – singer, actress, and equestrienne who paid tribute to Salamanca in one of her early hits, "Adoro mi tierra" (1950).
Enriqueta Jiménez Chabolla "La Prieta Linda" – singer and actress.

References

Link to tables of population data from Census of 2020 INEGI: Instituto Nacional de Estadística, Geografía e Informática
Guanajuato Enciclopedia de los Municipios de México

External links
Presidencia Municipal de Salamanca Official website

Populated places in Guanajuato
Municipalities of Guanajuato
Populated places established in 1603
1603 establishments in the Spanish Empire